Atomas is a science themed puzzle game available on IOS and Android. The goal is to get the highest score by combining elements. Atomas was developed by Sirnic Games, and released on February 24, 2015.

Gameplay 
The game begins with six atoms, usually hydrogen, helium and lithium (which have low atomic numbers) in a circular game board, unless the player has a special power equipped which makes the game start at magnesium, aluminum, and silicon. At the center, there is an atom which when the player taps moves to where they tapped. Sometimes there are plus or minus orbs (signs) in the center of the board instead of an atom. The plus orb allows the player to combine two like atoms into an element with a greater atomic number. Chain reactions can be formed by having the same atoms on either side of where the player places the plus orb. The minus orb allows the player to move an atom to a different location of the board or be converted into a plus orb if the player chooses. Occasionally there are black plus orbs (Dark Plus) which spawn with a 1/90 chance after a score of 750 and allow the player to combine two unlike atoms (opposed to two like atoms with the regular plus orb). Additionally, neutrinos spawn with a 1/60 chance after a score of 1500, and makes a copy of any orb on the board that you choose. Lucky charms are unlocked as the player advances and grant bonuses such as increasing the number of plus atoms. The game ends when the game board is full and can no longer place any new elements.

In addition to the Classic game mode as described above, there are also Time Attack, Zen and Geneva modes. In the Time Attack mode the player has to create the biggest element you can in a certain amount of time, and combining elements grants you more time. In the Geneva mode, instead of pluses the player receives Luxons instead. The player can shoot a Luxon at any atom and that atom will become a plus on the next round. In the Zen game mode, there is a 50% chance of the last atom before the game ends is a plus.

There is also antimatter which can be bought through an in-app purchase which clears half of the board.

References 

IOS games
Android (operating system) games